The Bonda language, also known as Bondo or Remo, is a south Munda language of the Austroasiatic language family spoken in Odisha, formerly known as Southern Odisha, in India. It had 2,568 speakers, all in Odisha, according to the 1951 Census of India, increasing to approximately 9,000 speakers in 2002 according to SIL.

Classification
The Bonda language is an indigenous language belonging to the Southern subgroup of the Munda branch of the Austroasiatic language family.  Bonda is a spoken language with no traditional written system recorded. Bonda is a part of the Gutob-Remo branch, due to the similarities Bonda shares with another Southern Munda Language named Gutob

History
The Bonda language derives its name from the tribe of the Bonda people, an indigenous group located in Odisha known as the Bonda Highlanders. In their native language, the Bonda people regard themselves as "Remo', which translates to human, and derive their language name from that root, calling their language as the human language or 'Remosam' in their native tongue

Geographic distribution
The language differs slightly, classified according to whether it can be categorized as Plains Remo (Bonda) or Hill Remo (Bonda).

Plains Remo
This is a subdivision of Bonda, localized in 35 villages throughout the Khairpat within the Malkangiri district in Odisha. In 1941, 2,565 people categorized the Plains Remo. That number nearly doubled in 1971, with 4,764 people classifying themselves as Plains Remo. The increase in population was not correlated with language extension. There are 3,500 speakers as of 2002, but few are monolingual.

Hills Remo
This is a subdivision of Bonda, localized in the Jeypore Hills region of Odisha. There are 5,570 speakers as of 2002.

Phonology

Stress  
In Bonda, primary stress is placed on the last syllable in a word, syllables with diphthongs, glottal stops, or checked consonants. However, Plains Remo primarily stresses the second syllable in a word. Bonda words can have a maximum of 5 syllables.

Diphthongs
Diphthongs are placed either in the beginning or middle of a word, usually used in combination of two different vowel types.

Consonants
There are 33 consonants in the Bonda language.

/z/ only occurs in loanwords from Odia.

Vowels
Bonda has 5 vowel phonemes: /a, e, i, o, u/.

In Bonda, vowels are nasalized and clusters are commonplace.

Grammar

Syntax
Bonda follows the SOV (Subject + Object + Verb) sequence, but other word orders are possible.

Gender 
Age and gender serve as classification denominations for individuals. Female names end in /-i/ and male names end in /-a/. Animals are also distinguished by gender.

Compound verb
The compound verb is not frequently used in Bonda and can be used as a conjunctive participle.

Vocabulary

Kinship terminology 
In Kinship terms, the velar nasal, ŋ, is often used. Various kinship terms also represent multiple positions.

References

External links
Patricia Donegan & David Stampe’s Online Remo Dictionary
Remo to English Talking Dictionary

Languages of India
Munda languages